Andres Karlos Roberto Geddy (born 10 December 1997) is an Indonesian professional footballer who plays for Liga 2 club Persewar Waropen as a forward.

Club career

Persewar Waropen
Geddy joined the Persewar Waropen club in the 2020 Liga 2. This season was suspended on 27 March 2020 due to the COVID-19 pandemic. The season was abandoned and was declared void on 20 January 2021.

References

External links 
 Andres Geddy at Soccerway
 Andres Geddy at Liga Indonesia

1997 births
Living people
Indonesian footballers
Liga 2 (Indonesia) players
Association football forwards
Perseru Serui players
Persewar Waropen players